Hawaspur is a village located in Mansurchak Block of Begusarai district in Bihar. Positioned in rural region of Begusarai district of Bihar, it is one among the 38 villages of Mansurchak Block of Begusarai district.

Geography
The total geographical area of village is 105 hectares. Hawaspur has a total population of 2,924 people. There are about 596 houses in Hawaspur village. Dalsinghsarai is nearest town to Hawaspur which is approximately 10 km away.

Demographics

Education

Transport
Roadways

Railyways

Climate

References

Villages in Begusarai district
Begusarai district